Ajuga bombycina is a species of flowering plant in the family Lamiaceae, native to the east Aegean Islands and south-west and south Turkey.

References

bombycina
Flora of the East Aegean Islands
Flora of Turkey
Plants described in 1879
Taxa named by Pierre Edmond Boissier